The Europe Zone was one of the three regional zones of the 1971 Davis Cup.

30 teams entered the Europe Zone, competing across 2 sub-zones. The winners of each sub-zone went on to compete in the Inter-Zonal Zone against the winners of the Americas Zone and Eastern Zone.

Czechoslovakia defeated Romania in the Zone A final, and West Germany defeated Spain in the Zone B final, resulting in both Czechoslovakia and Romania progressing to the Inter-Zonal Zone.

Zone A

Draw

First round
Sweden vs. France

Finland vs. Ireland

Egypt vs. Czechoslovakia

Portugal vs. Turkey

Greece vs. Belgium

Denmark vs. Soviet Union

Quarterfinals
Switzerland vs. Spain

France vs. Finland

Czechoslovakia vs. Portugal

Belgium vs. Soviet Union

Semifinals
Spain vs. France

Czechoslovakia vs. Soviet Union

Final
Czechoslovakia vs. Spain

Zone B

Draw

First round
Hungary vs. Poland

Luxembourg vs. Monaco

Israel vs. Norway

Romania vs. Netherlands

Italy vs. Bulgaria

Yugoslavia vs. Great Britain

Quarterfinals
West Germany vs. Austria

Hungary vs. Luxembourg

Israel vs. Romania

Yugoslavia vs. Italy

Semifinals
West Germany vs. Hungary

Romania vs. Yugoslavia

Final
Romania vs. West Germany

References

External links
Davis Cup official website

Davis Cup Europe/Africa Zone
Europe Zone
Davis Cup
Davis Cup
Davis Cup
Davis Cup
Davis Cup
1971 in German tennis